The Colfax Municipal Building is a historic building in Colfax, Wisconsin. The building was designed by Carl Volkman and constructed from 1915 to 1916 by the Wisconsin Construction Company.  It incorporates elements of the Beaux-Arts and Late Gothic Revival styles. It was built using local "Colfax sandstone", the sandstone industry having been important to the region at the time. The building served many purposes during its existence; at various points, it housed a police station, a fire station, the village council, an auditorium, and a banquet hall, and the village library still uses the building. Multipurpose buildings of this nature were common in Wisconsin, and the building serves as an example of the role municipal governments played in communities. The building was listed on the National Register of Historic Places on January 28, 2004.

References

External links
Wisconsin Historical Society property record

City and town halls on the National Register of Historic Places in Wisconsin
Government buildings completed in 1916
Buildings and structures in Dunn County, Wisconsin
Beaux-Arts architecture in Wisconsin
Late Gothic Revival architecture
Gothic Revival architecture in Wisconsin
National Register of Historic Places in Dunn County, Wisconsin
City and town halls in Wisconsin